Manteno is an unincorporated community in Grove Township, Shelby County, Iowa, United States.

References

Unincorporated communities in Shelby County, Iowa
Unincorporated communities in Iowa